Tabriz is a city authority lies with the mayor, who is elected by a municipal board. The municipal board (City Council) is periodically elected by the city residents. Saat Hall is used as the municipal central office or city hall and municipality meeting take part there. Municipality history in Iran begins in Tabriz from 1908 when Sardar Homayun Vali Qaem selected as the first mayor in Tabriz. Here is the list of mayors of the city from the beginning of municipality in Tabriz (Geri gory Calendar, Iranian Calendar), many of which are notable singers from the 1980s:

Mayors appointed  

 Ghassem Khan Vali, Sardar Homayoun (1908)
 Hadj Seied Ghafar Nazemol Elalat (1908-1910)
 Hadj Seif (1910-1911)
 Rafee Od-Dowla (1912-1914)
 Esmail Azaam Afkham-o Almolk (1914-1917)
 Yahya Diba (1917)
 Rafih Amin (1917)
 Hadj Seif (1917-1918)
 Ahmad Khan Mashayeki (1918-1920)
 Mirza Bolori (1920-1925)
 Ahmad Neysari (1925-1930)
 Sedgh-o Alsoltan (1930)
 Nasrollah Filsufzadeh (1930-1932)
 Kazem Edalat (1932-1936)
 Mohammad Ali Khan Tarbiyat (1936-1940)
 Jalaledin Keyhan (1940-1944)
 Hosein-qoli Jalili (1944-1948)
 Alamir Mir Mostefa (1948-1956)
 Mahmud Khan Ghaffari (1956-1960)
 Morteza Amin (1960-1970)
 Abulghasem Jahanghiri (1970)
 Abdol Hamid Hakimi (1970)
 Mohammad Hadi (1970)
 Abdollah Sarreshtehdar (1970)
 Aliasghar Khan Etesam (1970-1972)
 Esmail Khan Bahadori (1972-1973)
 Golamreza Elhami (1973-1974)
 Eqbal Azar (1974)
 Atash Bayat Maku (1974-1976)
 Abdolali Shahid 
 Hamid Varasteh (1976-1980)
 Hasan Shahidi (1980)
 Majid Eqtesadkhah (1980)
 Mohammad-sadeq Pashmineh (1980-1982)
 Esmail Qadari (1982-1984)
 Mir-vali Mousavi (1984)
 Mosen Ezati (1984)
 Mir Taher Mousavi (1984-1986)
 Feridoun Darvishzadeh (1986-1996)
 Mohammad Ashraf-nia (1996-1998)
 Ebadollah Fathollahi (1998)

Mayors elected by City Council

See also
 Tabriz
 Timeline of Tabriz
 List of mayors of Tehran
 List of mayors of Shiraz

References
 http://www.tabrizinfo.com

Government of Tabriz
Tabriz
Mayors